Bernadette Smith  is a Canadian First Nations politician who was elected to the Legislative Assembly of Manitoba in a by-election on June 13, 2017. She represents the electoral district of Point Douglas as a member of the Manitoba New Democratic Party.

Personal life and education 
Smith was born and raised in Winnipeg. She left school in Grade 11, completing her high school education at age 22. She subsequently obtained a Child and Youth Care Certificate from Red River Community College.

Smith is Anishinaabe and Métis. Her sister, Claudette Priscilla June Osborne-Tyo, has been missing from Winnipeg since 2008. She has three children: Aron, Matthew and Makena.

She was awarded the Order of Manitoba in 2016.

Career
She was a teacher at Maples Collegiate and the Assistant Director of WayFinders Program at the Seven Oaks School Division. She is the co-founder of the Manitoba Coalition of Families of Missing and Murdered Women in Manitoba (CFMMWM) and the Drag the Red Initiative.

Politics
Smith was the only candidate to submit her name in order to qualify as the New Democratic Party's candidate for Point Douglas in the 2017 by-election. During the campaign, the opposing Progressive Conservative Party filed a complaint with Elections Manitoba alleging that Smith had improperly campaigned at polling stations. Smith won the seat with 44% of the vote.

She was re-elected in the 2019 provincial election.

Smith has advocated for some form of government investment in order to preserve the Neechi Commons grocery store and arts centre.

References

Living people
Members of the Order of Manitoba
21st-century Canadian politicians
Politicians from Winnipeg
Red River College alumni
New Democratic Party of Manitoba MLAs
First Nations women in politics
Women MLAs in Manitoba
21st-century Canadian women politicians
Year of birth missing (living people)
Métis politicians
First Nations politicians
Canadian Métis people